The 2003 Stroud Council election took place on 1 May 2003 to elect members of Stroud District Council in Gloucestershire, England. One third of the council was up for election and the Conservative Party stayed in overall control of the council.

After the election, the composition of the council was
Conservative 28
Labour 10
Liberal Democrat 6
Green 4
Independent 3

Election result

Ward results

References

2003 English local elections
2003
2000s in Gloucestershire